Sergio Álvarez Boulet (born 11 October 1979) is a Cuban weightlifter.

He represented Cuba at the 2000 Summer Olympics, ranking 5th.

He participated in the men's -56 kg class at the 2006 World Weightlifting Championships and won the silver medal, finishing behind Li Zheng. He snatched 123 kg and clean and jerked an additional 156 kg for a total of 279 kg, only 1 kg behind winner Li.

He twice won the gold medal at the Pan American Games in the 56 kg category.

At the 2008 Summer Olympics he ranked 6th in the 56 kg category, with a total of 272 kg.

References

External links
 Athlete Biography at beijing2008

Cuban male weightlifters
1979 births
Living people
Weightlifters at the 1999 Pan American Games
Weightlifters at the 2007 Pan American Games
Weightlifters at the 2011 Pan American Games
Weightlifters at the 2000 Summer Olympics
Weightlifters at the 2008 Summer Olympics
Weightlifters at the 2012 Summer Olympics
Olympic weightlifters of Cuba
Pan American Games gold medalists for Cuba
Pan American Games medalists in weightlifting
Central American and Caribbean Games gold medalists for Cuba
Competitors at the 2006 Central American and Caribbean Games
World Weightlifting Championships medalists
Central American and Caribbean Games medalists in weightlifting
Medalists at the 2007 Pan American Games
Medalists at the 2011 Pan American Games
Pan American Weightlifting Championships medalists
20th-century Cuban people
21st-century Cuban people